At Night All Cats Are Crazy (lit. At night all cats are grey) is a French film by Gérard Zingg released in 1977.

Synopsis 
Charles Watson tells Lily, his 10-year-old niece, a story about a character called Philibert, a bad boy. Lily wants to meet the latter and loses herself in a world where fiction and reality are mixed up. Her uncle believes as far as he's concerned, that he possesses literary gifts and loves living in the greatest of comforts.

Datasheet 
 Directed by : Gérard Zingg
 Screenplay : Gérard Zingg and Philippe Dumarçay
 Music : Jean-Claude Vannier
 Editing : Hélène Viard
 Casting : Margot Capelier
 Set designer : Jean-Pierre Kohut-Svelko
 Distribution : Accatone Distribution, France
 Production France 3 Cinéma (France), Prodis (France) et Sam Films
 Producer : Pierre Hanin
 Country : France
 Release date : 23 novembre 1977 (France)
 Genre : Comedy drama
 Duration : 124 min

Cast 
 Gérard Depardieu : Philippe Larcher
 Robert Stephens : Charles Watson
 Laura Betti : Jacqueline
 Tsilla Chelton : Madame Banalesco
 Charlotte Crow : Lily
 Albert Simono : Gaston, aka "Gastounet"
 Virginie Thévenet : Jeannette
 Dominique Laffin : The shop assistant
 Raoul Delfosse : The bald man
 Ann Zacharias : The white cat
 Gabriel Jabbour : Mr Banalesco
 Irina Grjebina : The withered beauty Lily Fayol : The joyful widow Jean Lemaître : M. Chatin Roger Muni : The barman Gérard Hernandez : The punter Julien Verdier : The man in his sixties''

References

External links
 
 La nuit, tous les chats sont gris sur festival-lumiere.orge

French comedy-drama films
1970s French-language films
1977 films
1970s French films